The ESF Co-Ed Slowpitch European Super Cup (CSPESC) is a club championship tournament between national club champions for co-ed Slowpitch Softball teams in Europe, governed by the European Softball Federation.

Results

Medal table

References

External links
 European Softball Federation

European Softball Championship
Multi-national professional sports leagues